Dharwad Institute of Mental Health and Neurosciences (DIMHANS) is a public medical institution in Dharwad, Karnataka which provide healthcare facilities specializing in Mental Health, Psychiatry and Neuroscience. Additionally DIMHANS offers several Post-Graduate academic programs.

History
DIMHANS was started as a "Lunatic asylum" in 1845 in the premises attached to a jail. Later in 1885 some rooms of the jail were used as wards for keeping patients. In year 1909, asylum was separated from the jail and a wall around asylum was constructed. In year 1922, British Government declared asylum as “Government Mental Hospital”. In 1993, with intention to reduce stigma, name of the hospital was changed from “Government Mental Hospital” to “Karnataka Institute of Mental Health" (KIMH). Based on the recommendations of the D. M. Nanjundappa report on correction of  regional disparities in Karnataka, the institute was converted into a autonomous post-graduation training  institute and renamed as Dharwad institute of Mental Health and Neurosciences (DIMHANS) during a legislative assembly session in 2009.

In 2011, several proposals were sent to state government to upgrade DIMHANS's ageing infrastructure.

In 2020, a Covid-19 testing center was started at DIMHANS. DIMHANS has emerged as a major testing facility in North Karnataka for Covid-19.

In November 2021, Karnataka High Court gave ultimatum to state government to upgrade DIMHANS as a higher center for psychiatry and to provide MRI machines by March 1, 2022. In the same month, a new building "Bendre Block", CT Scan facilities were inaugurated.

Organization and administration

Departments
DIMHANS has following departments:
Psychiatry
Clinical Psychology
Psychiatric Social Work
Psychiatric Nursing
Neuroanaesthesia

Centres
Child and Adolescent Psychiatry
Addiction Psychiatry
Cognitive Neurosciences

Academics

Programmes
DIMHANS offers following courses
MD in Psychiatry
MPhil in Clinical Psychology
MPhil in Psychiatric Social Work
MSc in Psychiatric Nursing
Post Basic Diploma in Psychiatric Nursing

Services and facilities
DIMHANS provides Day-care and Psychiatric Rehabilitation services. Day-care and psychiatric rehabilitation services was established to help persons with chronic and disabling mental disorders to return to an optimal level of functioning. DIMHANS runs a Mental Health Program across Karnataka to raise awareness among people about Mental Illnesses and reduce stigma surrounding Mental Health problems. DIMHANS also provide free legal advice and De-addiction services.

References

External links
 Official website
Health in Karnataka
Mental health organisations in India
Postgraduate schools